The uneven-striped ctenotus (Ctenotus vagus)  is a species of skink found in Western Australia.

References

vagus
Reptiles described in 2009
Taxa named by Paul Horner (herpetologist)